Ella Mastrantonio (born 22 January 1992) is an Australian midfielder currently playing with Perth Glory. She has previously played for Perth Glory, Melbourne Victory, Bristol City, Lazio, and Pomigliano.

Club career

Perth Glory and Melbourne Victory
Mastrantonio made her professional debut for Perth Glory during the 2009 season. She then played for them and for Melbourne Victory over eight seasons, including winning the 2013–14 W-League championship with Melbourne Victory.

Western Sydney Wanderers
In November 2019, Mastrantonio joined Western Sydney Wanderers.

Bristol City
On 30 June 2020, it was announced that Mastrantonio had joined Bristol City after spending over a decade playing in the Australian top-flight. She made her debut for the club in a 4–0 home loss to Everton in the FA WSL. Mastrantonio was released upon the expiration of her contract at the end of the 2020–21 FA WSL season.

Lazio
In July 2021, Mastrantonio signed a two-year contract with Italian club Lazio, following their promotion to the Serie A ahead of the 2021–22 season. She was the first Australian woman to join the club after consulting with the club's assistant coach Nicola Williams who had previously coached Perth Glory. Following poor form by the club, which included the dismissal of coach Carolina Morace who had recruited Mastrantonio, she departed the club in December 2021 to try to find another club in Europe to play for and to increase her chances for an international call-up.

Pomigliano
In January 2022, Mastrantonio joined Serie A club Pomigliano.

Return to Perth Glory
In July 2022, Mastrantonio returned to Australia, signing a two-year contract with Perth Glory for her fourth stint with the club.

International career
Mastrantonio made her debut for Australia in June 2008 against Japan.

International goals

Career statistics

Club 
As of 20 February 2021.

Honours

International
Australia
 AFF Women's Championship: 2008

References 

1992 births
Australian women's soccer players
Australian expatriate sportspeople in England
Australian people of Italian descent
Sportspeople from Perth, Western Australia
Living people
Perth Glory FC (A-League Women) players
Melbourne Victory FC (A-League Women) players
Western Sydney Wanderers FC (A-League Women) players
A-League Women players
Australia women's international soccer players
Women's association football midfielders